This is a list of places named after Captain James Cook (1728–1779), the British explorer.

Countries 
Cook Islands

Country subdivisions 
Cook County, New South Wales, Australia
Division of Cook, an electoral division in New South Wales, Australia
County of Cook, Queensland, Australia
Electoral district of Cook, Queensland, Australia

Towns 
Cook, Australian Capital Territory
Cooktown, Queensland, Australia
Cook's Harbour, Newfoundland, Canada
Mount Cook, Wellington, a suburb in New Zealand
Cooks Beach, Coromandel, a town in New Zealand
Captain Cook, Hawaii, United States

Geographic features

Bodies of water 
Cooks River, New South Wales, Australia
Cook's Bay (Ontario), Canada
Cooks Brook (Newfoundland), Canada
Cook Bay (Tierra del Fuego), Chile
Cooks Anchorage, also known as Tautira Bay, Tahiti, French Polynesia
Cook's Bay (Moorea), French Polynesia
Cook Channel, an arm of Dusky Sound, New Zealand
Cook Stream, in Pickersgill Harbour, Dusky Sound, New Zealand
Cook's Cove, near Tolaga Bay, New Zealand
Cook River (New Zealand)
Cook Strait, New Zealand
Cook Bay (South Georgia)
Cook Inlet, Alaska, United States

Glaciers 
Cook Glacier, Kerguelen Islands, French Southern and Antarctic Lands
Cook Glacier (South Georgia)

Islands 
Cook Island (New South Wales), Australia
Cook Island, Tierra del Fuego, Chile
Cook Island, Kiritimati, Kiribati
Cook Island, South Sandwich Islands
Cook Rock, South Sandwich Islands

Mountains
Cook Mountains, Antarctica
 Mount Cook near Cooktown, Queensland, Australia
Mount Cook (Saint Elias Mountains), Yukon, Canada and Alaska, United States
Aoraki / Mount Cook, New Zealand

Extraterrestrial features 
3061 Cook, a minor planet
Cook crater, the Moon

See also
Cook's Cottage, Melbourne, Australia
 James Cook Observatory, Gisbourne, New Zealand
 James Cook railway station, Middlesbrough, England
 James Cook University, Queensland, Australia
 James Cook University Hospital, Middlesbrough, England
Seventeen Seventy, Queensland, Australia

Cook
Cook
Named after Captain James Cook
Cook
Cook
Cook

Australian toponymy